Miss Universe Thailand 2022 was the 23rd edition of Miss Universe Thailand pageant held on July 30, 2022 at True Icon Hall, Bangkok, Thailand. Miss Universe Thailand 2021 Anchilee Scott-Kemmis crowned Anna Sueangam-iam as her successor at the end of the event, who represented Thailand in Miss Universe 2022.

Background

Power of Resilience crown 
On June 16, 2022, Jimmy Mouawad launched the name of their brand-new crown for Miss Universe Thailand 2022 pageant as "Power of Resilience". This crown marks their third consecutive year for the Miss Universe Thailand pageant. It was officially released on July 22, 2022 during a gala night called "Ignite The Night".  The crown was influenced by its two key motifs: the peacock feathers and a lotus flower which both embodies the resiliency of the Thai nation to stand up amidst challenging obstacles in life while the whole crown was embellished and crafted with peridot, white topaz and diamonds to evoke new beginnings and growth.

Results

Placements
Color keys

 
§ – Voted into the Top 11 by viewers.

Contestants
29 contestants competed for the title of Miss Universe Thailand 2022:

22 - Perpetua Smith withdrew before the preliminary competition was scored by the judges.

Crossovers and returnees

National pageants

Miss Thailand World
 2018: Nicolene Bunchu (Winner)

Miss Universe Thailand
 2018: Thitaree Kasorn (1st Runner-up)
 2018: Nicolene Bunchu (Top 10)
 2019: Patraporn Wang (Top 5)

Miss Grand Thailand
 2014: Patraporn Wang (3rd Runner-up)
 2018: Kanyalak Nookaew (Top 12)
 2018: Carina Muller 
 2019: Kanyalak Nookaew (Top 10)

Miss Thailand
2020: Nitthakarn Aksornwan (1st Runner-up)
2020: Anna Sueangam-iam (Top 16)

Miss Thinn Thai Ngarm
 2020: Anna Sueangam-iam (2nd Runner-up)
 2020: Nitthakarn Aksornwan

International pageants

Miss World
 2018: Nicolene Bunchu (1st Runner-Up)

Miss Intercontinental
 2014: Patraporn Wang (Winner)

Notes

References

External links

2022
July 2022 events in Thailand
2022 beauty pageants
Beauty pageants in Thailand
MUT Ringside Reality
MUT Ringside Reality